Kristen Hancher (b. May 17, 1999) is a Canadian pornographic actress.

Career 
Hancher was born in Ontario. She began her career on the live broadcasting site YouNow, then moved to Instagram and the social media service musical.ly, which was later merged into TikTok. On April 1, 2020, she was the 11th most followed person on the site. As of March 2020 she has over 5.8 million Instagram followers and 1 million subscribers on YouTube.

In July 2019, Hancher was criticized on social media for riding on a horse swimming in water. BuzzFeed News noted that horses are able to swim and that research has shown swimming can be beneficial for them.

In 2021 she uploaded her first pornographic video on the platform OnlyFans.

Filmography 
Hancher has starred in the following films:

Awards and nominations
Hancher was nominated for Choice Muser at the Teen Choice Awards in 2016 and 2017. She was also nominated for in 2017 for Breakout Creator at the Streamy Awards.

References

1999 births
Living people
Social media influencers
Actresses from Ontario
Canadian TikTokers